The Belen Pass, known in antiquity as the Syrian Gates (Syríai Pýlai), is a pass through the Nur Mountains located in the Belen District of Hatay Province in south-central Turkey. 

Ancient geographers described the pass through what was then known as the Amanus Mountains as 300paces across. Historically, it and the Amanian Gate to its north formed the most important route between the regions of Cilicia and Syria. Near the western end of the pass is the Pillar of Jonah, marking the spot where the Hebrew prophet was supposedly disgorged by the great fish that had consumed him.

Around 401BC, Cyrus the Younger passed through the Syrian Gates without a fight when his army of 100,000including the ten thousand Greek mercenaries immortalized by Xenophon's Anabasiscompelled the Persian general opposing them to order his garrison to retreat.

After the 333BC Battle of Issus, Alexander the Great's army pursued DariusIII through the pass. 

In 39BC, it was the scene of the Battle of Amanus Pass between Roman forces under P. Ventidius Bassus and Parthian forces under Pharnapates. The Romans completely routed the Parthian army and killed its commander, compelling PacorusI to withdraw across the Euphrates and allow the Romans to restore their rule over Syria over the course of the next year.

The Crusader fortification at Çalan was surveyed in 1979. 

The pass received its present name following its conquest by the Turks.

On July 28, 1832, a major battle took place at the pass between the Ottoman and Egyptian armies, where the forces of Ibrahim Pasha defeated the Turks.

See also
 Belen
 Cilician Gates

References

Mountain passes of Turkey
Landforms of Hatay Province